Ecuador competed at the 1980 Summer Olympics in Moscow, USSR. Twelve competitors, eleven men and one woman, took part in thirteen events in five sports.

Athletics

Women's 100 m Hurdles
Nancy Vallecilla
 Heat — did not start (→ did not advance)

Women's Pentathlon
 Nancy Vallecilla — 3170 points (→ no ranking)
 100 metres — 14.46s
 Shot Put — 11.12m
 High Jump — 1.68m
 Long Jump — 5.45m
 800 metres — DNF

Boxing

Men's Light Flyweight (48 kg)
 Lincoln Salcedo
 First Round — Bye
 Second Round — Lost to Ahmed Siad (Algeria) on points (0-5)

Men's Flyweight (51 kg)
 Jorge Monard

Men's Heavyweight (+ 81 kg)
 Luis Castillo
 First Round — Lost to Jürgen Fanghänel (East Germany) on points (1-4)

Cycling

Four cyclists represented Ecuador in 1980.

1000m time trial
 Esteban Espinosa

Individual pursuit
 Jhon Jarrín

Team pursuit
 Esteban Espinosa
 Jhon Jarrín
 Edwin Mena
 Juan Palacios

Judo

 Jimmy Arévalo
 Milton Estrella

Swimming

 Diego Quiroga
 Enrique Ledesma

References

External links
Ecuador Olympic Committee
Official Olympic Reports

Nations at the 1980 Summer Olympics
1980 Summer Olympics
Olymp